Davey Lake may refer to:

Davey Lake (Alberta)
Davey Lake (Saskatchewan)

See also
Davy Lake